Albert Basil Orme Wilberforce (14 February 1841 – 13 May 1916) was an Anglican priest and author in the second half of the 19th century and the first two decades of the 20th. He was the Chaplain to the Speaker of the House of Commons and Archdeacon of Westminster.

Biography

Early life
Born in Winchester as the youngest son of Samuel Wilberforce (and therefore grandson of famed abolitionist William Wilberforce; his elder brother Ernest became Bishop of Newcastle then of Chichester), he was educated at Eton College and Exeter College, Oxford and ordained in 1866.

Career
He was chaplain to the Bishop of Oxford and then held curacies at Cuddesdon, Seaton and Southsea. He was Rector of St. Mary's, Southampton from 1871 to 1894, and an Honorary Canon of Winchester. In April 1894 he was appointed Canon of Westminster Abbey and Rector of the parish church of St John the Evangelist, annexed to Westminster.

He was appointed Chaplain to the Speaker of the House of Commons in 1896, and continually re-elected to the post until his death in 1916. Biographer Charlotte Elizabeth Woods wrote that "[f]ew Chaplains have filled this time-honoured post with so much dignity, grace, and distinction."

In 1900 he was appointed the Archdeacon of Westminster.

Personal life

He married Charlotte Langford on 28 November 1865 at St Paul's Church, Knightsbridge. Both of them were supporters of the Broadlands conference on spiritualism.

He was a strong supporter of the temperance movement, and abstained from all alcohol after 31. He was good friends with temperance leader Lady Henry Somerset.

He met 'Abdu'l-Baha, the last of three "central figures" of Baháʼí Faith, in 1911.

He died on 13 May 1916. He was 75.

Partial list of published works
The battle of the Lord. (London : Elliot Stock)
The established church and the liquor traffic : being a letter addressed to His Grace the Archbishop of Canterbury.
Important correspondence with Canon Wilberforce on vivisection. (Boston, Mass.)
Mystic Immanence, the Indwelling Spirit.
New (?) theology : thoughts on the universality and continuity of the doctrine of the immanence of God. (London : Stock) 1908
Our Father's Lent and His Easter land. (Butler & Tanner)
The secret of the quiet mind. (London : E. Stock)
Seeing God : personal recognition of divine love. (London : Elliot Stock)
Sermon preached to the 2nd special service battalion of the Royal Canadian regiment, in Westminster Abbey, on Advent Sunday.
Spiritual consciousness. (New York : Dodd, Mead)
There is no death. (New York : Dodd, Mead)
The trinity of evil : I. infidelity, II. impurity, III. intemperance. (Toronto : S.R. Briggs) 1885
Why does not God stop the war?. (London : Elliot Stock)
Down in the Depths: The Awakening of the Spirit.
Following on to Know. 1904
Speaking Good of His Name. 1905
Sanctification by the Truth. 1906
The Hope that is in me. 1909
The Power that Worketh in us. 1910
Sermons preached in Westminster Abbey. 1898 (1st series), 1902 (2nd series)

References

Works cited (by date)
News items and websites listed in Reference section only.

External links
 
 
 National Portrait Gallery - Albert Basil Orme Wilberforce (1841-1916), Archdeacon of Westminster; son of Samuel Wilberforce

1841 births
Alumni of Exeter College, Oxford
Archdeacons of Westminster
1916 deaths
Canons of Westminster
Basil
People educated at Eton College